Chung Hyung-min is a South Korean biotechnology professor. He was appointed professor at CHA University in 1997 after obtaining his BA, MA and Ph.D degree at Konkuk University.

Currently, he is a professor of biomedical science at CHA University, Director of CHA Stemcell Institute, President of CHA Bio & Diostech Inc., Member of LMO Assessment Advisory Committee for Ministry of Health and Welfare, and Advisor for the Ministry of Knowledge Economy under the National Technical Advisory Committee. Dr Chung is a prominent leader in the field of stem cell research with over 20 years of experience.

His research aims at the development of stem cell therapies using human adult and embryonic stem cells. Primarily, his study focusses on the clinical applications of human embryonic stem cell-derived retinal cells, artificial blood and cardiovascular cells.

His research group became only the second in the world to be approved
to conduct clinical application of human embryonic stem cells for the treatment of an orphan disease named Stargardt's macular dystrophy.

Education
 1987: B.Sci., Kon-Kuk University, Department of Animal Biotechnology (major: Animal Biotechnology)
 1993: Ph.D., Kon-Kuk University, Department of Animal Biotechnology (major: Animal Biotechnology)
 1998: Visiting scientist, Columbia University, Department of Obstetrics and Gynecology.

Awards
 October 3, 1998: Second Place Prize Paper, International Federation of Fertility Societies (IFFS) 16th World Congress on Fertility and Sterility and 54th Annual Meeting of the American Society for Reproductive Medicine (ASRM) in San Francisco ("In Vitro Blastocyst Formation of Human Oocytes Vitrified at the Immature, Maturing or Mature Stage"), California, United States.
 October 21, 2000: Best Video Award Winner, American Society for Reproductive Medicine (ASRM), ("Birth of a Baby Developed from Vitrified Oocytes"), 56th Annual Meeting at San Diego, California, United States.
 October 16, 2004: The 2004 Society for Assisted Reproductive Technology (SART) Prize Paper "Genes differentially expressed in primordial, primary and secondary follicles by cDNA microarray", 60th Annual Meeting of American Society for Reproductive Medicine (ASRM) at Philadelphia, USA.
 2009: "CEO of Next generation" (for Bio Technology), Ministry of Knowledge Economy, South Korea.

Publications

References

External links
 <차바이오앤디오스텍> 
 <차의과학대학교> 
 http://stemcell.cha.ac.kr/ 

1964 births
Living people
South Korean scientists
Stem cell researchers